Myophorella is a genus of fossil saltwater clams, marine bivalve mollusks in the family  Trigoniidae. These bivalves are sometimes preserved with mineralized soft tissue.

References

External links 
 

Trigoniidae
Prehistoric bivalve genera
Jurassic bivalves
Prehistoric bivalves of North America
Cretaceous molluscs of Europe